Los Choneros is an Ecuadorian criminal organization originating from the town of Chone in the Manabí Province. They are dedicated to extortion, murder, contract killings, drug trafficking among other crimes. They are currently present in much of the Ecuadorian coast, and according to the National Police of Ecuador, they are the armed wing of a Colombian cartel with interests within the country. Its original leaders are imprisoned or were killed and many have been part of the list of the most wanted in Ecuador.

History
Los Choneros was formed around 2005 in the city of Manta. In its beginning, it had eight members, with ages between 18 and 30 years. Jorge Bismark Véliz Spain, was its founder and first leader who was known as "Chonero" or "Teniente España". Bismark is said to have started out as a drug dealer in the city's barrios.

At the beginning, Teniente España worked for "Los Queseros" . However, at a party, the head of the gang of "Los Queseros" (Carlos Jesús Cedeño Vera, "El Rojo" "El Quesero"), becomes enemies with Teniente España. Therefore, the leader of Los Queseros orders to finish off Teniente España. That night with the intention of killing Teniente España who was wounded, his wife dies, and his daughter is injured. He along with criminal family members and friends of his (they were called the gang of "Los Choneros"), among them Jorge Luis Zambrano, who at that time was his hitman, for revenge, murdered the brother of the leader of Los Queseros. (Jhonny Verdy Cedeño Vera, “El Barón”) and his son (Cristhian Jonathan Cedeño Briones). Therefore, war breaks out between the two sides. Of which, Los Queseros were exterminated. From Los Choneros, a few survived that allowed them to continue with organized crime.

Many citizens of Chone have changed the name that represents them so as not to be confused with members of the criminal gang.

On 28 December 2020, Zambrano was murdered in the Mall del Pacífico shopping center while he was in a cafeteria.

References

Organizations established in 2005
2005 establishments in Ecuador
Drug cartels
Crime in Ecuador